General Sir Richard Thomas Farren  (1817–1909) was a British Army officer who became General Officer Commanding Eastern District.

Military career
Farren was commissioned as an ensign in 1834. He commanded the 47th (Lancashire) Regiment of Foot during the Crimean War for which he was awarded the Turkish Order of the Medjidie, 4th Class.

He went on to be General Officer Commanding Eastern District in October 1869 and General Officer Commanding the Troops in the West Indies in June 1875.

He was made Colonel of the 35th (Royal Sussex) Regiment of Foot from 1879 until it was amalgamated in 1881 with the 107th Foot to form the Royal Sussex Regiment, after which he was Colonel of the 1st Battalion of the new regiment until 1885. He was afterwards Colonel of The Loyal North Lancashire Regiment from 1885 to his death. He was promoted full general on 29 April 1880.

He died in 1909 at the age of 92. His death was registered in Woodbridge, Suffolk. He is buried in the churchyard of St Mary's, Great Bealings, Suffolk.

References

|-

|-

|-

1817 births
1909 deaths
Burials in Suffolk
British Army generals
Knights Grand Cross of the Order of the Bath